Kenny Greene (January 17, 1969 – October 1, 2001) was an American singer-songwriter who was also a member of the R&B group Intro.

Career
As a member of the R&B group Intro, Greene wrote and produced many of the group's tracks and was lead vocalist. He also wrote many songs for other artists, such as Mary J. Blige's "Reminisce" and "Love No Limit." For his work with Blige, Greene won the Songwriter of the Year award from the American Society of Composers, Authors & Publishers'. Greene also worked with Will Smith, Cam'ron and 98 Degrees.

In 1998, the singer had appeared on Cam'ron's album Confessions of Fire and AZ's album Pieces of a Man. The last time he recorded was early in 2001 singing background vocals for Tyrese on the song "For Always"  on the 2000 Watts album.

Death
In a 2001 interview with Sister 2 Sister magazine, Greene revealed that he was bisexual and that he was suffering from AIDS. He died in New York City at the age of 32 due to complications of the disease.

References

External links
 

1969 births
2001 deaths
AIDS-related deaths in New York (state)
African-American record producers
Record producers from Michigan
African-American male singer-songwriters
American rhythm and blues singer-songwriters
American soul musicians
Bisexual men
Bisexual singers
Bisexual songwriters
LGBT record producers
LGBT African Americans
LGBT people from New York (state)
American LGBT singers
American LGBT songwriters
American contemporary R&B singers
20th-century American LGBT people
20th-century African-American male singers
American bisexual writers